Rafael Lucena Marques (born 11 September 1989) is a Portuguese football player who plays for Oriental.

Club career
He made his professional debut in the Segunda Liga for Oriental on 20 September 2015 in a game against Desportivo Aves.

References

1989 births
Living people
Portuguese footballers
Association football goalkeepers
C.D. Olivais e Moscavide players
Clube Oriental de Lisboa players
Liga Portugal 2 players
S.U. Sintrense players